Although the bulk of its area is covered by ice caps inhospitable to most forms of life, Greenland's terrain and waters support a wide variety of plant and animal species. The northeastern part of the island is the world's largest national park. The flora and fauna of Greenland are strongly susceptible to changes associated with climate change.
 	
The image galleries below link to information related to the flora and fauna of Greenland, including Latin taxonomy, Danish translations, and links to articles in the Danish Wikipedia, which can be helpful when searching for more information.

Flora

310 species of vascular plants were said to be found in Greenland in 2019, including 15 endemic species. Although individual plants can be profuse in favourable situations, relatively few plant species tend to be represented in a given place. 

In northern Greenland, the ground is covered with a carpet of mosses and low-lying shrubs such as dwarf willows and crowberries. Flowering plants in the north include yellow poppy, Pedicularis, and Pyrola. Plant life in southern Greenland is more abundant, and certain plants, such as the dwarf birch and willow, may grow several feet high.

The only natural forest in Greenland is found in the Qinngua Valley.

Horticulture shows a certain degree of success. Plants such as broccoli, radishes, spinach, leeks, lettuce, turnips, chervil, potatoes and parsley are grown up to considerable latitudes, while the very south of the country also rears asters, Nemophila, mignonette, rhubarb, sorrel and carrots. Over the decade to 2007, the growing season lengthened by as much as three weeks.

In the 13th-century Konungs skuggsjá (King's mirror), it is stated that the old Norsemen tried in vain to raise barley.  

Recent research from archaeological digs on Greenland by the National Museum in Copenhagen discovered barley grains and concluded that the Vikings were able to grow barley.

Fauna

Land mammals
Among the large land mammals are the musk ox, the caribou, the polar bear and the white Arctic wolf. Other familiar mammals in Greenland include the Arctic hare, collared lemming, Beringian ermine and Arctic fox. Caribou hunting is of considerable cultural importance to the people of Greenland.

Domesticated land mammals include dogs, which were introduced by the Inuit, as well as such European-introduced species as goats, Greenlandic sheep, oxen and pigs, which are raised in modest numbers in the south.

Marine mammals
As many as two million seals are estimated to inhabit Greenland's coasts; species include the hooded seal (Cystophora cristata) as well as the grey seal (Halichoerus grypus). Whales frequently pass very close to Greenlandic shores in the late summer and early autumn. Species represented include the beluga whale, blue whale, Greenland whale, fin whale, humpback whale, minke whale, narwhal, pilot whale, sperm whale. Whaling was formerly a major industry in Greenland; by the turn of the 20th century, however, the right whale population was so depleted that the industry was in deep decline. Walruses are to be found primarily in the north and east of the country; like narwhal, they have at times suffered from overhunting for their tusks.

Birds
As of 1911, 61 species of birds were known to breed in Greenland. Certain birds such as the eider duck, guillemot and ptarmigan are often hunted for food in the winter.

Fish
Of the many species of fish inhabiting Greenland's waters, several have been of economic importance, including cod, caplin, halibut, rockfish, nipisak (Cycloperteus lumpus) and sea trout. The Greenland shark is used for the oil in its liver, as well as fermented and eaten as hákarl, a local delicacy.

See also
 Fauna
 List of mammals of Nunavut
 List of Nunavut birds

 Flora
 List of Canadian plants by family

References

 01
 01
Greenland

Biota of archipelagoes